Achim von Kries was a German military officer who served in the 1932-1935 Chaco War between Paraguay and Bolivia, commanding Bolivian armored fighting vehicles. He was wounded in action during the second battle of Nanawa. Von Kries later founded the Landesgruppe-Bolivie, the Bolivia branch of the German Nazi Party's Auslands-Organisation.

References

Bolivian military personnel
Foreign military officers of the Chaco War
Bolivian people of German descent
Nazis in South America
Year of birth missing
Year of death missing
People of the Chaco War